John Theodore Mintun (July 12, 1894 – February 25, 1976) was professional American football player who played as a center for seven seasons for the Decatur/Chicago Staleys (1920–1921), the Racine Legion (1922–1924), the Kansas City Cowboys (1925), and the Racine Tornadoes (1926).

Mintun grew up in Piatt County, Illinois before moving to Decatur as a teenager, where he played for the independent Decatur Indians team; during a November 1915 game, he received the nickname "Jack" from a local newspaper. He later joined A. E. Staley's baseball team before being drafted into the United States Army in 1918; he served with the 34th Infantry Division in France until his discharge. In 1919, he was a member of Staley's new football team, where he played center and kicker. He scored three touchdowns for the Staleys that year on an interception return, muffed punt return, and a fumble return. The following year, he became an employee at A. E. Staley as a millwright, and was named their night supervisor in 1932.

References

External links
 

1894 births
1976 deaths
American football centers
American football placekickers
Chicago Staleys players
Decatur Staleys players
Kansas City Cowboys (NFL) players
Racine Legion players
Racine Tornadoes players
United States Army personnel of World War I
People from Cambridge, Nebraska
People from Piatt County, Illinois
Players of American football from Illinois